The Women's 400 metre individual medley competition of the 2014 European Aquatics Championships was held on 18 August.

Records
Prior to the competition, the existing world, European and championship records were as follows.

Results

Heats
The heats were held at 10:25.

Final
The final was held at 18:36.

References

Women's 400 metre individual medley